"Canceled" is a song by American YouTuber Larray. It was released on October 18, 2020. The song is a comedic diss track aimed at various social media stars. The song was produced by Taz Taylor, Pharaoh Vice, and S.Diesel.

Background and composition
The majority of the song is backed by a pitch-shifted sample from American rapper Tay-K's "The Race". The song serves as a diss track to many of those mentioned in the song, including Shane Dawson, Tana Mongeau, and the Dolan Twins.

Music video
The music video was released on the same day as the song. It was directed and edited by JakeTheShooter and Larray.

Controversy
Roughly a week after the release, Larray addressed backlash he received from the track on TikTok about supposedly "normalizing child grooming", stating:

Chart performance
The song reached number 81 on the Billboard Hot 100, making it Larray's first entry on the chart. It also charted at number 34 on the magazine's Hot R&B/Hip-Hop Songs chart and at 96 on the Canadian Hot 100.

Charts

Certifications

References

2020 songs
2020 singles
Songs written by Taz Taylor (record producer)
Child grooming